The 2000–01 network television schedule for the six major English language commercial broadcast networks in the United States. The schedule covers primetime hours from September 2000 through August 2001. The schedule is followed by a list per network of returning series, new series, and series cancelled after the 1999–2000 season.

PBS is not included; member stations have local flexibility over most of their schedules and broadcast times for network shows may vary.

New series are highlighted in bold.

All times are U.S. Eastern and Pacific Time (except for some live sports or events). Subtract for one hour for Central, Mountain, Alaska and Hawaii-Aleutian times.

From September 15 to October 1, 2000, all of NBC's primetime programming was preempted in favor of coverage of the 2000 Summer Olympics in Sydney.

Each of the 30 highest-rated shows is listed with its rank and rating in parenthesis (#rank / rating), as determined by Nielsen Media Research.

Legend

Sunday

Note: UPN had acquired the Sunday evening XFL games from February 11th to April 15th (to compete with Fox's Sunday night lineup), while NBC broadcasts Saturdays games till the end of the season.

Monday

Tuesday

Wednesday

Note: On Fox, Schimmel supposed to air 8-8:30, but it was cancelled due to production problems.

Thursday

Note: On Fox, an untitled Michael Crichton project was supposed to air at midseason at 9–10, along with The Lone Gunmen at 8-9 but that Crichton project for Fox was scrapped.

Friday
{| class="wikitable" style="width:100%;margin-right:0;text-align:center"
|-
! colspan="2" style="background-color:#C0C0C0;text-align:center"|Network
! style="background-color:#C0C0C0;text-align:center"|8:00 p.m.
! style="background-color:#C0C0C0;text-align:center"|8:30 p.m.
! style="background-color:#C0C0C0;text-align:center"|9:00 p.m.
! style="background-color:#C0C0C0;text-align:center"|9:30 p.m.
! style="background-color:#C0C0C0;text-align:center"|10:00 p.m.
! style="background-color:#C0C0C0;text-align:center"|10:30 p.m.
|-
! rowspan="8"|ABC
! Fall
| rowspan="2"|Two Guys and a Girl
| The Trouble with Normal
| rowspan="2"|Norm
| rowspan="2"|Madigan Men
| style="background:#6699CC;" colspan="2" rowspan="8"|20/20
|-
! December
| Dot Comedy
|-
! Follow-up
| style="background:#00FFFF;" colspan="2"|Who Wants to Be a Millionaire 
| Two Guys and a Girl
| Norm
|-
! February
| Two Guys and a Girl
| Norm
| style="background:#00FFFF;" rowspan="5" colspan="2"|Who Wants to Be a Millionaire 
|-
! April
| colspan="2"|Making the Band
|-
! May
| Whose Line Is It Anyway?
| style="background:#C0C0C0;"|Whose Line Is It Anyway? 
|-
! Summer
| colspan="2"|Making the Band
|-
! Mid-summer
| colspan="2"|America's Funniest Home Videos
|-
! rowspan="4"|CBS
! Fall
| colspan="2"|The Fugitive
| style="background:#00FFFF;" colspan="2"|CSI: Crime Scene Investigation 
| colspan="2" rowspan="3"|Nash Bridges
|-
! Winter
| rowspan="3" colspan="2"|Diagnosis: Murder
| colspan="2"|The Fugitive
|-
! Summer
| colspan="2"|Diagnosis: Murder
|-
! Follow-up
| colspan="2"|That's Life
| style="background:#6699CC;" colspan="2"|48 Hours
|-
! rowspan="8"|Fox
! Fall
| colspan="2" rowspan="2"|World's Wildest Police Videos| colspan="2"|FreakyLinks| style="background:#abbfff;" colspan="2" rowspan="8"|Local programming
|-
! Follow-up
| colspan="2"|Million Dollar Mysteries|-
! December
| style="background:#bf8fef;" colspan="4"|Fox Night at the Movies|-
! Winter
| colspan="2" rowspan="3"|World's Wildest Police Videos| colspan="2"|FreakyLinks|-
! February
| style="background:#FA8072;" colspan="2"|Various specials
|-
! Spring
| colspan="2"|The Lone Gunmen|-
! Summer
| colspan="2"|The Lone Gunmen| colspan="2"|FreakyLinks|-
! Mid-summer
| colspan="2"|World's Wildest Police Videos| colspan="2"|Dark Angel|-
! colspan="2"|NBC
| colspan="2"|Providence| style="background:#6699CC;" colspan="2"|Dateline NBC| style="background:#FF00FF;" colspan="2"|Law & Order: Special Victims Unit 
|-
! rowspan="7"|UPN
! Fall
| colspan="2"|Freedom| colspan="2" rowspan="2"|Level 9| style="background:#abbfff;" colspan="2" rowspan="12"|Local programming
|-
! Winter
| rowspan="2"|Gary & Mike| rowspan="2"|Celebrity Deathmatch|-
! Follow-up
| style="background:#FA8072;" colspan="2"|Various specials
|-
! Spring
| rowspan="2" style="background:#C0C0C0;"|The Parkers 
| rowspan="2" style="background:#C0C0C0;"|The Hughleys 
| rowspan="2"|Gary & Mike| style="background:#C0C0C0;"|Celebrity Deathmatch 
|-
! Follow-up
| Gary & Mike|-
! May
| style="background:#bf8fef;" colspan="4"|UPN's Night at the Movies|-
! August
| colspan="2" |Manhunt| colspan="2" |All Souls|-
! rowspan="5"|The WB
! Fall
| rowspan="5"|Sabrina the Teenage Witch| Grosse Pointe| colspan="2" rowspan="4"|Popular|-
! November
| style="background:#C0C0C0;"|Sabrina the Teenage Witch 
|-
! Winter
| Popstars USA|-
! April
| rowspan="2" style="background:#C0C0C0;"|Sabrina the Teenage Witch 
|-
! Summer
| colspan="2" style="background:#C0C0C0;"|Charmed 
|}

NOTE: ABC aired Dot Comedy on December 8, 2000, at 8:30pm ET. The show was cancelled after one episode aired. On Fox, Night Visions was supposed to air 8–9, but it was delayed to summer in a different timeslot on Thursdays.

Saturday

By network

ABC

Returning series20/20America's Funniest VideosDharma & GregMaking the BandMonday Night FootballNYPD BlueOnce and AgainPrimetime ThursdaySpin CityThe Drew Carey ShowThe Norm ShowThe PracticeThe Wonderful World of DisneyTwo Guys and a GirlWho Wants to Be a MillionaireWhose Line Is It Anyway?New seriesThe Beast *Dot Comedy *The Geena Davis ShowGideon's Crossing *The Job *Madigan MenThe Mole *My Wife and Kids *The Trouble With NormalThe Wayne Brady ShowWhat About Joan? *You Don't Know Jack *

Not returning from 1999–2000:Boy Meets WorldClerksIt's Like, You Know...Odd Man OutOh, Grow UpSabrina the Teenage Witch (moved to The WB)SnoopsSports NightTalk to MeThe Hughleys (moved to UPN)Then Came YouTurning PointWastelandWonderlandCBS

Returning series48 Hours60 Minutes60 Minutes IIBeckerBig BrotherCandid CameraCBS Wednesday MovieCBS Sunday MovieCity of AngelsDiagnosis: MurderEverybody Loves RaymondFamily LawJAGJudging AmyThe King of QueensLadies ManNash BridgesSurvivorTouched by an AngelWalker, Texas RangerNew seriesBetteBig Apple *CSI: Crime Scene InvestigationThe DistrictThe FugitiveKate Brasher *Some of My Best Friends *That's LifeWelcome to New YorkYes, DearCanceled/EndedChicago HopeCosbyEarly EditionFalconeGrapevineKids Say the Darndest Things (moved to ABC in 2019-20)Love & MoneyMartial LawNow and AgainWinning LinesWork with MeFox

Returning seriesAlly McBealAmerica's Most Wanted: America Fights BackCOPSFamily GuyFOX Night at the MoviesFuturamaGuinness World Records PrimetimeKing of the HillMalcolm in the MiddleThat '70s ShowThe SimpsonsTitusThe X-FilesWorld's Wildest Police VideosNew seriesBoot Camp *Boston PublicDark AngelFreakyLinksGrounded for Life *The Lone Gunmen *Million Dollar Mysteries *Murder in Small Town X *Night Visions *Normal, OhioThe $treetTemptation Island *

Not returning from 1999–2000:ActionBeverly Hills, 90210Get RealGreedHarsh RealmParty of FiveThe PJs (moved to The WB)Ryan Caulfield: Year OneTime of Your LifeThe World's Funniest!NBC

Returning series3rd Rock from the SunERDaddioDateline NBCFrasierFriendsJust Shoot Me!Law & OrderLaw & Order: Special Victims UnitMysterious WaysNBC Sunday Night MovieProvidenceThird WatchThe West WingWill & GraceWorld's Most Amazing VideosNew seriesCursed (renamed The Weber Show)DAGDeadlineThe Downer Channel *EdFear Factor *The Fighting Fitzgeralds *First Years *Go Fish *Kristin *The Michael Richards ShowNBC Saturday Night MovieSpy TV *Three Sisters *TitansTuckerThe Weakest Link *

Not returning from 1999–2000:Battery ParkCold FeetFreaks and GeeksGod, the Devil and Bob (returned to Adult Swim in 2011)JesseThe Mike O'Malley ShowM.Y.O.B.The OthersThe PretenderProfilerSammyStark Raving MadSuddenly SusanTwenty-OneVeronica's ClosetUPN

Returning seriesThe Hughleys (moved from ABC)MoeshaThe ParkersSeven DaysStar Trek: VoyagerUPN's Night at the MoviesWWF SmackDown!New seriesAll Souls *Celebrity Deathmatch *Chains of Love *FreedomGary and Mike *GirlfriendsLevel 9Manhunt *Special Unit 2 *

Canceled/EndedThe BeatBlockbuster Video Shockwave CinemaDilbertGrown UpsI Dare You: The Ultimate ChallengeMalcolm & EddieSecret Agent ManShasta McNastyThe StripThe WB

Returning series7th HeavenAngelBuffy the Vampire SlayerCharmedDawson's CreekFelicityFor Your LoveJack & JillPopularRoswellSabrina the Teenage Witch (moved from ABC)The Jamie Foxx ShowThe PJs (moved from Fox)The Steve Harvey ShowNew seriesDead LastFlix From the FrogGilmore GirlsGrosse PointeHypeNikkiThe Oblongs *Popstars USA *

Not returning from 1999–2000:7th Heaven BeginningsBaby Blues (returned to Adult Swim in 2002)Brutally NormalD.C.Movie StarsMission HillSafe HarborYoung AmericansZoe (formerly Zoe, Duncan, Jack, and Jane)

Note: The * indicates that the program was introduced in midseason.

Renewals and cancellations

Renewals
ABC
 20/20 - renewed for a twenty-fourth season.
 America's Funniest Videos - renewed for a thirteenth season.
 Dharma & Greg - renewed for a fifth and final season.
 The Drew Carey Show - renewed for a seventh season.
 The Job - renewed for a second season.
 The Mole - renewed for a second season.
 Monday Night Football - renewed for a thirty-first season.
 My Wife And Kids - renewed for a second season.
 NYPD Blue - renewed for a ninth season.
 Once And Again - renewed for a third and final season.
 The Practice - renewed for a fifth season.
 Primetime Thursday - renewed for a thirteenth season.
 Spin City - renewed for a sixth and final season.
 What About Joan - renewed for a second season.
 The Wayne Brady Show - renewed for a second season.
 Who Wants to Be a Millionaire - renewed for a third season.
 Whose Line Is It, Anyway? - renewed for a fourth season.
 The Wonderful World of Disney - renewed for a fortieth season.

CBS
 48 Hours - renewed for a twenty-fifth season.
 60 Minutes - renewed for a thirty-fourth season.
 Becker - renewed for a fourth season.
 Big Brother - renewed for a third season.
 CBS Sunday Movie - renewed for a sixteenth season.
 CSI: Crime Scene Investigation - renewed for a second season.
 The District - renewed for a second season.
 Everybody Loves Raymond - renewed for a sixth season.
 Family Law - renewed for a third season.
 JAG - renewed for a seventh season.
 Judging Amy - renewed for a third season.
 The King of Queens - renewed for a fourth season.
 Survivor - renewed for a second and a third season.
 That's Life - renewed for a second season.
 Touched by an Angel - renewed for an eighth season.
 Yes, Dear - renewed for a second season.

Fox
 Ally McBeal - renewed for a fifth and final season.
 America's Most Wanted: America Fights Back - renewed for a fourteenth season.
 Boston Public - renewed for a second season.
 COPS - renewed for a thirteenth season.
 Family Guy - renewed for a third season.
 Futurama - renewed for a third season.
 Grounded for Life - renewed for a second season.
 King of the Hill - renewed for a fifth season.
 Malcolm in the Middle - renewed for a third season.
 The Simpsons - renewed for a thirteenth season.
 Temptation Island - renewed for a second season.
 That '70s Show - renewed for a fourth season.
 Titus - renewed for a third season.
 The X-Files - renewed for a tenth and final season.

NBC
 Dateline NBC- renewed for a tenth season.
 Ed - renewed for a second season.
 ER - renewed for an eighth season.
 Fear Factor - renewed for a second season.
 Frasier - renewed for a ninth season.
 Friends - renewed for an eighth season.
 Just Shoot Me! - renewed for a fifth season.
 Law & Order - renewed for a twelfth season.
 Law & Order: Special Victims Unit - renewed for a third season.
 Providence - renewed for a third season.
 Third Watch - renewed for a third season.
 Three Sisters - renewed for a second season.
 Weakest Link - renewed for a second season.
 The West Wing - renewed for a third season.
 Will & Grace - renewed for a fourth season.

UPN
 Buffy the Vampire Slayer - Renewed And Moving to UPN for a sixth season.
 Girlfriends - renewed for a second season.
 The Hughleys - renewed for a third season.
 The Parkers - renewed for a third season.
 Roswell - Renewed And Moving to UPN for a third and final season.
 Special Unit 2 - renewed for a second season.
 WWF SmackDown! - renewed for a third season.

The WB
 7th Heaven - renewed for a seventh season.
 Angel - renewed for a third season.
 Charmed - renewed for a fourth season.
 Dawson's Creek - renewed for a fourth season.
 Felicity - renewed for a fourth season.
 For Your Love - renewed for a fifth and final season.
 Gilmore Girls - renewed for a second season.
 Nikki - renewed for a second season.
 Popstars USA - renewed for a second season.
 Sabrina the Teenage Witch - renewed for a sixth season.
 The Steve Harvey Show - renewed for a sixth and final season.

Cancellations and Series endings

ABCDot Comedy - cancelled after airing one episode on December 8, 2000.The Geena Davis Show - cancelled after one season.Gideon's Crossing - cancelled after one season.Madigan Men - placed on hiatus and later cancelled after one season.The Norm Show - cancelled after three seasons. The series finale aired April 6, 2001.The Trouble With Normal - cancelled after one season.Two Guys and a Girl - cancelled after four seasons. The series finale aired May 16, 2001.

CBSBette - cancelled after one season.Candid Camera - moved to PAX.City of Angels - cancelled after two seasons.Diagnosis: Murder - ended its run after eight seasons. The series finale aired May 11, 2001Kate Brasher - cancelled after six episodes.Nash Bridges - ended its run after six seasons. The series finale aired on May 4, 2001.Some of My Best Friends - cancelled after airing five out of the seven episodes produced.Walker, Texas Ranger - ended its run after eight seasons. The series finale aired May 19, 2001.Welcome to New York - cancelled after one season.

FoxDark Angel - cancelled after two seasons.FreakyLinks - cancelled after one season.Normal, Ohio - cancelled after one season.The $treet - pulled from the schedule after seven episodes.

NBC3rd Rock from the Sun - ended its run after six seasons. The series finale aired May 22, 2001.Cursed - cancelled after one season.Daddio - pulled from the schedule after four episodes into its second season.DAG - cancelled after one season.Deadline - cancelled after one season.The Michael Richards Show - cancelled after one season.Titans - pulled from the schedule after 11 episodes.Tucker - cancelled after one season.World's Most Amazing Videos - later revived by Spike in 2008.

UPNFreedom - pulled from the schedule after 7 episodes.Level 9 - pulled from the schedule after 10 episodes.Moesha - cancelled after six seasons. The final episode aired on May 14, 2001.Seven Days - cancelled after six seasons. The final episode aired on May 29, 2001.Star Trek: Voyager - ended its run after seven seasons with a two-hour series finale on May 23, 2001. The next franchise entry, Star Trek: Enterprise premiered the following season.

The WBBuffy the Vampire Slayer - Moved to UPN for two more seasons.Grosse Pointe - cancelled after one season.Hype - cancelled after one season.Jack & Jill - cancelled after two seasons.The Jamie Foxx Show- Cancelled after 6 seasonMichelle - Cancelled after five seasons.The Oblongs- cancelled after 13 episodesThe PJs - cancelled after three seasonsPopular - cancelled after two seasons.Roswell'' - cancelled after two seasons. Moved to UPN for a third and final season.

References

United States primetime network television schedules
United States Network Television Schedule, 2000-01
United States Network Television Schedule, 2000-01